The Swimming competition at the 6th Pan American Games was held in Cali, Colombia during the Games' run in 1971. It consisted of 29 long course (50 m) events: 15 for males and 14 for females.

A world record was beaten in this edition of the Games, by the U.S. 4 x 200 m freestyle men's relay.

The victory of Canada in the women's 4x100m medley marked the first time that the U.S. lost the gold in a relay event, at the Pan American Games.

In the 200 m butterfly, two swimmers won the first medals of their countries in swimming at Pan American Games at all times: Jorge Delgado got the gold for Ecuador, and Augusto González, the bronze for Peru.

Results

Men's events

Women's events

Medal table

References

 Folha Online
  Medalists – List of international swimming medalists compiled by International Swimming Hall of Fame

 
1971
1971 Pan American Games
Pan American Games